The 2019–20 Georgia Southern Eagles women's basketball team represented Georgia Southern University in the 2019–20 NCAA Division I women's basketball season. The Eagles, led by first year head coach Anita Howard, played their home games at Hanner Fieldhouse and were members of the Sun Belt Conference. They finished the season 10–20, 7–11 in Sun Belt play to finish in ninth place. The qualified for the Sun Belt tournament, seeded ninth, were defeated by No. 4 Louisiana by the score of 64–81. Shortly after being eliminated, the Sun Belt canceled the remainder of the tournament which was followed by the NCAA cancelling all remaining post-season play.

Preseason

Sun Belt coaches poll
On October 30, 2019, the Sun Belt released their preseason coaches poll with the Eagles predicted to finish in eleventh place in the conference.

Sun Belt Preseason All-Conference team

2nd team

Alexis Brown – SR, Guard

Roster

Schedule

|-
!colspan=9 style=| Exhibition

|-
!colspan=9 style=| Non-conference regular season

|-
!colspan=9 style=| Sun Belt regular season

|-
!colspan=9 style=| Sun Belt Women's Tournament

See also
 2019–20 Georgia Southern Eagles men's basketball team

References

External links

Georgia Southern Eagles women's basketball seasons
Georgia Southern